The canton of Raspes et Lévezou is an administrative division of the Aveyron department, southern France. It was created at the French canton reorganisation which came into effect in March 2015. Its seat is in Pont-de-Salars.

It consists of the following communes:
 
Alrance
Arques
Ayssènes
Broquiès
Brousse-le-Château
Canet-de-Salars
Les Costes-Gozon
Curan
Lestrade-et-Thouels
Pont-de-Salars
Prades-Salars
Saint-Laurent-de-Lévézou
Saint-Léons
Saint-Rome-de-Tarn
Saint-Victor-et-Melvieu
Salles-Curan
Ségur
Trémouilles
Le Truel
Vézins-de-Lévézou
Le Vibal
Villefranche-de-Panat

References

Cantons of Aveyron